The Southeast Conference of the United Church of Christ is the regional body of the United Church of Christ within the states of Alabama, northwestern Florida, Georgia, Mississippi, South Carolina, and Tennessee (except the city of Memphis). It maintains headquarters in Atlanta. The Rev. Char Burch serves as the executive (Interim Conference Minister).

This conference bears the strong heritages of several missionary efforts, dating back to the postbellum period of the late 19th century, although one church was founded as early as 1681. At least half of the cumulative membership of the Conference's churches is African-American, reflecting the mission work of the American Missionary Association, as well as more recent church planting targeting that constituency. Although historically a mission territory and among the smaller conferences in the denomination, the Southeast Conference is beginning to see signs of growth, encouraged by an aggressive campaign to instigate new congregations and an increasing emphasis on peace and justice witness programs.

In addition to the conference minister, several associate conference ministers implement programming to provide educational, youth, and evangelistic ministries for the churches. The Conference holds its annual meeting every June, and is governed by a board of directors between those meetings. The board consists of officers and representatives elected by delegates to the annual meeting, themselves in turn elected or appointed by the local congregations. For the 2016–2018 term, Rev. J.R. Finney is moderator.

Heritage and predecessors
Although the Southeast Conference as a legal entity dates back only to 1966, it had several predecessors whose separate histories had to be reconciled in the new body. This work coincided almost precisely with the social ferment and upheavals of the Civil Rights Movement, which several clergy and churches fervently supported and/or played an active role in.

The different heritages were:

American Missionary Association
As mentioned above, the American Missionary Association planted numerous academies and colleges for those African-Americans freed from slavery by virtue of the South's defeat in the American Civil War. In some cases, former Union officers returned to territories they had conquered to aid the emancipated new citizens. Among those institutions still existing today are Fisk University (Tennessee), Atlanta University (now Clark Atlanta University, Georgia), Talladega College (Alabama), and Tougaloo College (Mississippi).

Alongside their activities in educating, many of the teachers, who were often Congregational pastors, founded churches for the freed people. A large number of them were founded in the beginning, but only 14 still remain in the Conference today. AMA congregations in the Southeast and South-Central states joined with "Afro-Christian" churches in North Carolina and Virginia to form the Convention of the South in 1950; that body was dismantled to distribute the congregations into their proper UCC geographical jurisdictions, ending segregation.

In the early 2000s, the Conference undertook a program to commemorate the legacy of those congregations and the AMA, titled "Rekindle the Gift." The Rev. Joyce Hollyday, then Associate Conference Minister and a former associate editor of Sojourners Magazine, wrote a book in 2005 examining the AMA's past and the existing congregations' recollections and hopes, titled On the Heels of Freedom: The American Missionary Association's Bold Campaign to Educate Minds, Open Hearts, and Heal the Soul of a Divided Nation, released by Crossroad Publishing.

The AMA also undertook educational and social work in the mountains of Tennessee and Kentucky during that period, operating several schools for Euro-American Appalachian youngsters, with some churches alongside them as well.

Christian Connection in Alabama and Georgia
The "Christian Connection," a group of churches loosely associated with the Restoration Movement, emerged in the Chattahoochee River valley of western Georgia and eastern Alabama in the mid-19th century with a number of congregations espousing the "five points" of Christian unity. This group later founded Southern Union College in Wadley, Alabama, now a part of the Alabama state junior/community college system. Most of their congregations were located in the open country and reflected the population's general preferences for Wesleyan/Arminian theology and revivalism, typical of the rural South generally. Two institutions related to the Christian tradition, Elon College (now University) and Elon Homes for Children, both located in North Carolina, received considerable financial support over the years from these churches.

Although a number of the churches in this group initially supported the UCC and the Conference in the 1960s and 1970s, most later reconsidered those commitments, in large measure due to increasing theological and political disagreements (instigated in part by pastors who came to those churches from other traditions) with those congregations in the metropolitan areas, especially over the issue of homosexuality. Only one congregation from this tradition is known to remain affiliated with the UCC, but remnant members of some of the defecting congregations formed a new one in 2006, located in Chambers County, Alabama.

Millard Fuller, founder of Habitat for Humanity, grew up in the Congregational Christian Church of Lanett, Alabama, a church which was affiliated with the Christian, Congregational Christian, and UCC tradition until 2010.

Congregational Methodist acquisition
Among Euro-American residents of Alabama and Georgia in the late 19th-century, some members of the Methodist faith began opposing the rise in power of the superintendents who began calling themselves "bishops." They desired local control, particularly the ability to call their own pastors, rather than have them appointed, without their consent. When some of these individuals and churches left the main Methodist body in the 1850s, a few of them later joined the Congregational fellowship in the 1880s and 1890s, recruited by agents of the American Home Missionary Society seeking a presence for Congregationalism in the South. Pockets of strength for this movement included northwestern, central, and southeastern Alabama; west central, south central, and northeastern Georgia; and the "Panhandle" region of northwestern Florida.

According to the book Southern Congregational Churches, self-published by UCC pastor and amateur historian Richard Taylor in 1994, the Congregational Methodist-heritage churches usually espoused extremely individualistic views, frequently opposing missionary societies and Sunday schools, very much akin to the Primitive Baptists and the Churches of Christ, two other groups that developed in the rural South during that same time. Therefore, they never developed close relations with Congregationalists in other parts of the U.S., since these stances were almost entirely opposite those honored in Congregational churches in most other regions, where education and mission work were held in very high regard.

Those churches not participating in this affiliation move (including some who recanted their earlier decisions to join the Congregationalists) constituted the Congregational Methodist Church, a small evangelical denomination headquartered in Mississippi. As with the Christians, nearly all of the Congregational Methodist-derived congregations eventually left the UCC over a period from the 1960s until the early 1990s, largely over the same theological and cultural disputes with denominational and Conference leadership. Only three of them remain in the UCC as of 2015, two in Alabama and one in Georgia.

Congregationalism as liberal alternative
Probably the most active of the several groups that formed the Southeast Conference were those Congregational churches founded, mostly in the early 20th century, as theologically liberal, socially tolerant alternatives to the dominant expressions of Southern Protestantism, namely the Baptists, Methodists, and Presbyterians. Migration of Northern Congregationalists to the South helped start several churches, often in close proximity to Euro-American colleges and universities (e.g., Vanderbilt University, Piedmont College). In a few cases, however, parts of established congregations withdrew to form Congregational churches in protest over doctrinal rigidity and/or lifestyle restrictions. These churches were located in cities such as Atlanta and Nashville; subsequent UCC new church starts in the Conference (e.g., Huntsville, Alabama and suburban Atlanta) have generally modeled themselves after this group, which has provided the dominant ethos to the UCC nationally ever since its inception.

By the mid-20th century, these became among the first Euro-American churches in the region to protest racial segregation and deeply involve themselves with advocating on African-Americans' behalf. And, since the 1990s especially, several of these have become Open and Affirming to LGBTQ populations, endorsing a stance to refrain from denying membership to those professing alternative sexual orientations, a move against the dominant social attitudes in the region.

Generally speaking, congregations in this group are the most aware of, and loyal to, the larger UCC, and are usually the most generous givers to Conference and national work. One reason for this is a high number of them have a significant percentage of members who previously belonged to UCC congregations elsewhere in the U.S., members who tend to be not only more aware of the denomination's heritage and program, but translate that knowledge into active support.

Euro-American Congregational Christian bodies
In the late 19th century, churches in the above three categories formed state conferences in Alabama, Georgia, Kentucky, and Tennessee. The Alabama conference included churches in northwestern Florida, and the Tennessee conference included African-American churches prior to 1915. Because none of the conferences was able to support a full-time superintendent (now known as conference minister, in the UCC) to itself, the conferences united in 1949 and became the Southeast Convention, with only minor adjustments to the territorial boundaries. This body had three superintendents:
The Rev. Dr. David W. Shepherd, 1949-1952
The Rev. Erston M. Butterfield, 1952-1957
The Rev. James H. Lightbourne, Jr., 1957-1965

Evangelical and Reformed, German and Swiss
After the Civil War, a group of settlers from Germany came, via Cincinnati, Ohio and Louisville, Kentucky, to northern Alabama and founded the town of Cullman, starting a church of the unionist Evangelical tradition; German immigrants to nearby Birmingham established a sister congregation there also. Meanwhile, some farmers from Switzerland, facing grave land shortages, responded to an advertisement in the 1870s offering farmland in Tennessee. Despite the fact that it amounted to a scheme to populate mountainous, infertile areas, the farmers (many of them dairymen) persevered, and some established Reformed parishes along the lines of the Swiss Protestant faith, several (only one survives) in southern middle Tennessee, and one in Nashville. As of today, only the Tennessee congregations remain affiliated with the UCC; the Alabama churches withdrew, led out in both cases by conservative pastors in the same manner as most of the Christian- and Congregational Methodist-heritage congregations have been.

History, 1966-present
In large measure, the Southeast Conference was the product of the determination of national and regional leaders to comply with the mandate from the denomination's General Synod to align inter-church relationships according to geography instead of racial and ethnic groupings inherited from the past. Because of differences among the churches and pastors in the Euro-American Southeast Convention regarding the denomination's involvement in the Civil Rights movement, the Southeast was one of the last regions in the country where all UCC congregations within its boundaries came together into one judicatory. Much of the immediate controversy was precipitated by a resolution from the Fourth General Synod, meeting in Denver, Colorado, in July 1963, that called for the termination of financial support for churches and institutions that practiced racial segregation and encouraged other UCC entities to do likewise. Only the adjoining Southern Conference, consisting of churches in North Carolina and southeastern Virginia, experienced difficulty organizing because of this, other than the Southeast.

After a failed attempt in 1964, the Southeast Convention, by a vote of only 54 percent, agreed to receive churches from the Congregational Christian (UCC) Convention of the South (African-American) and the southernmost congregations of the South Indiana Evangelical and Reformed Synod (the main portion of which became the Indiana-Kentucky Conference, UCC). This occurred at the convention's annual meeting on April 24, 1965, at Central Congregational Church, Atlanta. The agreement brought the conference officially into being on January 1, 1966. On April 23 of that year, meeting at First Evangelical and Reformed (now United) Church, Nashville, annual meeting delegates adopted a constitution, consummating the process. The first officers of the new conference were the Rev. Frederick A. Meyer, pastor, Central Church, Atlanta, moderator; Mr. J. Hubert Richter, member, St. John's (Evangelical Protestant) UCC, Cullman, Alabama, vice-moderator; Miss Ellen Hull, member, Langdale Congregational Christian Church, Valley, Alabama, recording secretary; Mr. Leslie Beall, member, Central Church, Atlanta, treasurer (the Cullman and Langdale churches in Alabama are no longer affiliated with the UCC). The board of directors consisted of association representatives and chairpeople of commissions elected at large; initially, the conference consisted of nine associations, but that number dropped to six by the early 1970s due to several of them merging.

Meanwhile, Conference staff and leaders, espousing the predominantly liberal outlook of the denomination, made extraordinary efforts to encourage churches to pursue aims such as advocating for peace in Vietnam, improved racial relations, and formulating a more articulate and relevant faith for the needs of the younger generations. This was particularly remarkable because Conference ministers, and associates, undertook these aims in addition to the daunting task of servicing the needs of churches spread over a seven-state region, which entailed much time and expense in travel and meetings distant from the Atlanta headquarters. Some churches were quite enthusiastic about all of these programs, engaging in experimental ministries and worship; others, mostly those outside the major metropolitan areas, resisted what they saw as an intrusion upon their traditions and autonomy, and these gradually began keeping to themselves, often only supporting their associations or customary benevolences. By the 1990s, many congregations simply decided to withdraw and form their own groupings or, just as often, become totally independent, a trait increasingly noticeable also among recently established churches of fundamentalist or charismatic persuasion in the region. Those moves reduced the six associations down to four.

As with most UCC conferences, most of the Southeast Conference's current congregations antedate the 1957 union that formed the denomination. Until about the late 1990s, the Conference was either financially unable to support significant church expansion or experienced great frustration and lack of success on those projects it did enter into. Most of these have been centered in the metropolitan Atlanta area, where demographic experts have perceived the greatest patterns of growth. Even more problematic was the fact that the Conference was dependent for many years on national subsidies simply to operate on a "maintenance" mode, let alone venture into expensive church building programs. Of course, the denomination was hindered by its lack of name recognition in the South (or, worse even, its confusion with the Churches of Christ, an entirely different evangelical Protestant tradition).

But, after years of decline and loss of disgruntled churches (which were mostly located in rural Alabama and Georgia), the Conference began to turn a corner in the 1990s, as it made an intentional effort to market its peculiar blend of evangelism and social justice witness to both its existing congregations (through renewal programs) and especially individuals and churches disaffected from their historic traditions (e.g., Baptists, Methodists, Presbyterians, and non-denominational, predominantly gay groups). The Conference, and some of its churches, has recently made particularly effective use of the UCC "God Is Still Speaking" branding campaign. In 2006, the conference launched a major church-planting campaign called the "Nehemiah Initiative", led by two associate conference ministers. This, in turn, has evolved into a new non-profit agency, the Center for Progressive Renewal, supported by the Conference, the UCC Local Church Ministries division, and the Cathedral of Hope (UCC) in Dallas, Texas. Furthermore, in response to revisions in nationally recommended standards for ordination and licensing, the Conference has developed, since the late 1990s, a correspondence theological education program, "PATHWAYS," to help local congregations more easily obtain ministers, a difficulty that has plagued the Conference's churches, most of whom have budgets insufficient to support a full-time ordained minister. Other conferences, such as Iowa, are also implementing the program and the UCC's Local Church Ministries division has given its seal of approval.

Host of 25th General Synod
From July 1–5, 2005, the Conference played host to the historic 25th General Synod of the UCC, which was held in Atlanta's Georgia World Congress Center. A resolution passed by synod delegates affirming the right of gay and lesbian persons to marry instantly drew national media attention, as this made the UCC the first traditional Protestant denomination in the U.S. to publicly espouse such a stand.

Aside from the generated publicity, two Conference members played noteworthy roles at that Synod: Dr. Annie Wynn Neal, an administrator at Meharry Medical College in Nashville (member, Howard Congregational Church) acted as one of two vice-moderators of Synod; and Milton Hurst, former Synod moderator, longtime Conference leader and pastor of First Congregational Church, Talladega, Alabama, gave a stirring speech recalling his grandfather, born into slavery in rural Alabama, telling stories about the racial discrimination and violence he witnessed and suffered. Mr. Hurst did this to recognize the culmination of the Conference's "Rekindle the Gift" project, on which he worked as a consultant. Sadly, one month after Synod, Mr. Hurst died at his Birmingham residence from injuries sustained in a fall.

Conference ministers
The Rev. Dr. Jesse H. Dollar (interim), 1966
The Rev. Dr. William J. Andes, 1966-1980
The Rev. Dr. Emmett O. Floyd, 1980-1987
The Rev. Horace S. Sills (interim), 1988
The Rev. Roger D. Knight, 1988-1995
The Rev. Edwin Mehlhaff (interim), 1995-1996
The Rev. Dr. Timothy C. Downs, 1996-2013
The Rev. Randall L. Hyvonen (interim), 2013-2014
The Rev. June E. Boutwell (interim), 2014-2017
The Rev. Marie Bacchiocchi (interim), 2017
The Rev. Char Burch (transitional), 2017–present

Associations
As with most conferences in the UCC, the Southeast Conference was composed of several associations. However, due to the associations' acceding to the Conference's request that ecclesiastical functions be turned over to a new conference-wide committee in 2012, only one, Alabama-Tennessee, is functioning as of 2015, and only as a fellowship group. One of the old associations, Georgia-South Carolina, voted to disband on June 15, 2013, during the annual Conference meeting. Its remaining functions were transferred to the Conference at that time.

Alabama-Tennessee Association
The Alabama-Tennessee Association was established over a period from 1965 through 1969 from the following bodies:

1) The Alabama-Mississippi Conference, consisting of the AMA-heritage churches in both states, most of which grew alongside the academies and colleges founded by missionaries from that organization in the late 19th century.

2) The Alabama-Tennessee Region of the Evangelical and Reformed Church, founded in 1952 as a division of the South Indiana E&R Synod. The four churches in this body briefly affiliated, by default, with the Indiana-Kentucky Conference (Kentuckiana Association) of the UCC (the legal successor of the South Indiana Synod) from 1963 through 1965.

3) The Kentucky-Tennessee Conference, which included Euro-American congregations in both states (the Kentucky churches were located in the mountainous southeastern corner of that state, all of which have since closed or joined other denominations) from 1915 through 1965.

4) Three congregations of the North Alabama Association, which consisted of Euro-American congregations in Alabama from Birmingham northward. Most churches in this group, which derived overwhelmingly from the Congregational Methodist tradition, did not approve of this arrangement for cultural and theological reasons and remained in the earlier body, until they withdrew from the UCC in a group action, circa 1990.

5) The Tennessee Conference, the African-American (mostly AMA) counterpart of the K-T Association, along with Trinity Church in Athens, Alabama. This association once included congregations in Little Rock, Arkansas, Lexington, Kentucky, Louisville, Kentucky, and Memphis, Tennessee, all of which had joined other UCC judicatories by the early 1960s.

The Rev. Gary Myers, pastor, Trinity Congregational Church, Athens, Ala., serves currently as moderator.

East Alabama-West Georgia Association
The East Alabama-West Georgia Association derived from the former Alabama Christian Conference (pre-1930s) and consists of churches in eastern central Alabama and western central Georgia, in the valley of the Chattahoochee River. Most of these churches were found in rural locations and originated from the "Christian Connection" movement.

Only four congregations remain members of this association, and its future as of 2015 is uncertain. The Rev. Wayde Washburn, pastor, Sandy Creek UCC, LaFayette, Ala., is moderator.

Georgia-South Carolina Association (1969-2013)
The Georgia-South Carolina Association represented a 1969 merger of the two previously racially defined bodies bearing that name; self-evidently, it contained churches in both states (except for Georgia churches in the East Alabama-West Georgia territory).

Like the nearby EA-WG Association, the Euro-American GSC group had a predominantly rural, evangelical-oriented constituency (predominantly Congregational Methodist), which often found itself at odds with Central Congregational Church in Atlanta. However, with several new missions in metropolitan Atlanta bearing Central's influence, support for liberal causes grew among the better part of the churches, and disaffected conservative congregations began leaving.

Meanwhile, the African-American grouping, who used the same name as the Euro-American body, began moving closer to the Euro-American GSC by ecumenical contacts initiated by several strong pastors, notably the Rev. Homer C. McEwen of First Congregational in Atlanta and the Rev. John Enwright of Plymouth Congregational in Charleston, S.C. By 1967, the two associations were meeting jointly and working together, enabling a smooth merger two years later.

In its later years, this association was located in one of the fastest-growing parts of the U.S., and received several new congregations into its ranks since 2000, most notably the 5,000-plus-member Victory Church, an African-American congregation in Stone Mountain, Ga., an Atlanta suburb. Two other congregations in the Atlanta area are jointly affiliated with the Alliance of Baptists, a liberal breakaway group from the Southern Baptist Convention.

Mr. George Drumbor, Circular Congregational Church, Charleston, S.C., was the final moderator.

South Alabama-Northwest Florida Association
The South Alabama-Northwest Florida Association was entirely composed of congregations between Montgomery, Alabama and the Florida Gulf Coast that came from the Congregational Methodist tradition. By 2000, all but two churches had departed, and the Association stopped holding meetings. The churches continue to relate to the UCC and the Conference, however, albeit nominally.

Currently affiliated churches

LEGEND:(AT)--Alabama-Tennessee Association(EW)--East Alabama-West Georgia Association(GS)--former Georgia-South Carolina Association (now affiliated directly with the Conference)(SN)--South Alabama-Northwest Florida Association (no longer functioning)*--indicates congregation endorses the "Open and Affirming" program of the UCC Coalition for Gay, Lesbian, Bisexual and Transgender Concerns, a recognized affinity group.#--indicates congregation derived from AMA heritage.$--indicates congregation in process of applying for membership to the association.

Alabama
King's Chapel Congregational, Alpine (AT)#
Trinity Congregational, Athens (AT)#
Beloved Community, Birmingham (AT)*
First Congregational Christian, Birmingham (AT)#
Pilgrim, Birmingham (AT)*
Liberty Congregational Christian, Brantley (SN)
Covenant Community, Center Point (AT)*
New Hope Congregational Christian, Clio (SN)
United Church of Huntsville, Huntsville (AT)*
Sandy Creek, LaFayette (EW)
First Congregational, Marion (AT)#
Open Table Community, Mobile (AT)*
Community Congregational, Montgomery (AT)
First Congregational Christian, Montgomery (AT)#
Unity, Montgomery (AT)
First Congregational, Talladega (AT)#

Florida
No churches at this time.

Georgia
Praxis, Americus (GS)$
Central Congregational, Atlanta (GS)*
First Congregational, Atlanta (GS)#
Kirkwood, Atlanta (GS)
Open Community, Duluth (GS)
Rehoboth Fellowship, Atlanta (GS)
Rush Memorial Congregational, Atlanta (GS)#
Sankofa, Atlanta (GS)
Virginia-Highland (UCC/Alliance of Baptists), Atlanta (GS)*
Evergreen Congregational, Beachton (GS)#
Restoration Inclusive Ministries, Decatur (GS)
Decatur UCC, Decatur (GS)
Methodist-Congregational Federated (UCC/United Methodist/NACCC), Demorest (GS)
Pilgrimage, Marietta (GS)*
Congregational, Midway (GS)#
Oak Grove Congregational Christian, Pine Mountain (EW)
First Congregational, Savannah (GS)#
Victory, Stone Mountain (GS)
Bethany Congregational, Thomasville (GS)#
Jones Chapel Congregational Christian, Woodbury (EW)

Mississippi
(All churches are members of the Alabama-Tennessee (AT) Association.)
Safe Harbor Family, Flowood
Union, Tougaloo College#

South Carolina
(All churches are directly affiliated with the Southeast Conference)
Circular Congregational, Charleston*
Peace Congregational, Clemson*
Garden of Grace United, Columbia*
Emmanuel, Greenville

Tennessee
(All churches are members of the Alabama-Tennessee (AT) Association.)
First United (Evangelical and Reformed), Belvidere
Pilgrim Congregational, Chattanooga*
United, Cookeville*
Congregational, Deer Lodge#
Community (UCC/Presbyterian Church (USA)), Fairfield Glade
Church of the Savior, Knoxville*
Brookmeade Congregational, Nashville*
Holy Trinity Community, Nashville*
Howard Congregational, Nashville#
Community, Pleasant Hill*#
First United Christian, Sweetwater
Phoenix Christian, Wildersville

External links
Southeast Conference, United Church of Christ

United Church of Christ
Protestantism in Alabama
Protestantism in Georgia (U.S. state)
Christianity in Mississippi
United Church of Christ in South Carolina
United Church of Christ in Tennessee